João Miguel Ferreira de Campos (born 19 February 1972), shortened to João Campos is a retired Portuguese football midfielder.

References

1972 births
Living people
Portuguese footballers
Associação Académica de Coimbra – O.A.F. players
Associação Naval 1º de Maio players
G.D. Sourense players
S.C. Pombal players
Association football midfielders
Primeira Liga players
Liga Portugal 2 players
Sportspeople from Coimbra